The Anglican Church of the Holy Trinity in Newton St Loe within the English county of Somerset is a Grade II* listed building.

A church has stood on the site, close to Newton St Loe Castle and Newton Park, since the 11th century, however the current stone building was constructed in the 14th with the tower being added in the 15th. It was restored in 1857. The bell tower has a clock face with only one hand.

History

A church stood on the site during the 11th century and was mentioned in the Domesday Book. The current building is from the 14th century. The tower was added in the 15th century.

In 1857 the church was restored and the north aisle was added by Charles Edward Davis who later became the Bath City Architect. The work was funded by William Gore-Langton.

The parish is part of the benefice of Farmborough, Marksbury and Stanton Prior, Corston and Newton St Loe, and within the archdeaconry of Bath.

Architecture
The stone building has north and south aisles, nave, chancel, west tower and organ chamber covered with a slate roof.

It has a three-stage west tower, supported by diagonal buttresses. On the tower is a clock face with a single hand. It contains six bells these were recast from the original five by Thomas Bilbie of the Bilbie family of Chew Stoke in 1741. The tower is separated from the nave by a wooden screen erected in 1909.

Interior

Most of the interior fittings, including the font, pews, pulpit and screen are from the 1857 restoration; however some of the monuments are considerably older. These include the marble tomb of Joseph Langton who died in 1701. A cast-iron railing surrounds the vault which also has an inscription on marble commemorating his seven children who all died prematurely.

The organ was installed in 1879.

Notable interments 
Hugh Warburton

See also
 List of ecclesiastical parishes in the Diocese of Bath and Wells

References

14th-century church buildings in England
Towers completed in the 15th century
Church of England church buildings in Bath and North East Somerset
Grade II* listed churches in Somerset
Grade II* listed buildings in Bath and North East Somerset